The Beiar Valley is a valley in the municipality of Beiarn in Nordland, Norway. Most of the residents of the municipality of Beiarn live in this valley.  

The highest parts of the southern end of the valley are located within Saltfjellet–Svartisen National Park. The Beiar River flows through the valley before emptying into the Beiar Fjord at the north end of the valley.

References

Beiarn
Valleys of Nordland